Wellfield Academy (formerly Wellfield High School) is a coeducational secondary school located in Leyland in the English county of Lancashire.

Wellfield High School was previously awarded specialist status as a Business and Enterprise College. Today, Wellfield Academy is a Community school administered by Lancashire County Council, however, while remaining a Community School, Wellfield Academy is currently being operated by the Endeavour Learning Trust, a multi-academy trust.

Wellfield Academy offers GCSEs as programmes of study for pupils.

References

External links
Wellfield Academy official website

Secondary schools in Lancashire
Schools in South Ribble
Leyland, Lancashire
Community schools in Lancashire